The 2018 Kangaroo Cup was a professional tennis tournament played on outdoor hard courts. It was the twenty-third edition of the tournament and was part of the 2018 ITF Women's Circuit. It took place in Gifu, Japan, on 30 April–6 May 2018.

Singles main draw entrants

Seeds 

 1 Rankings as of 23 April 2018.

Other entrants 
The following players received a wildcard into the singles main draw:
  Chihiro Muramatsu
  Suzuka Takoi
  Moyuka Uchijima
  Yuki Ukai

The following player received entry using a protected ranking:
  Misa Eguchi

The following players received entry from the qualifying draw:
  Hiroko Kuwata
  Abbie Myers
  Kyōka Okamura
  Mei Yamaguchi

Champions

Singles

 Kurumi Nara def.  Moyuka Uchijima, 6–2, 7–6(7–4)

Doubles
 
 Rika Fujiwara /  Yuki Naito def.  Ksenia Lykina /  Emily Webley-Smith, 7–5, 6–4

External links 
 Official website
 2018 Kangaroo Cup at ITFtennis.com

2018 ITF Women's Circuit
2018 in Japanese tennis
2018